Ostřetín is a municipality and village in Pardubice District in the Pardubice Region of the Czech Republic. It has about 900 inhabitants.

Administrative parts
The village of Vysoká u Holic is an administrative part of Ostřetín.

Notable people
Viktor Trkal (1888–1956), physicist and mathematician
Tomáš Koubek (born 1992), footballer

References

External links

Villages in Pardubice District